The 1830 New York gubernatorial election was held from November 1 to 3, 1830, to elect the Governor and Lieutenant Governor of New York.

Background
Martin Van Buren, who was elected Governor in 1828, was appointed United States Secretary of State by President Andrew Jackson.  Van Buren was succeeded in the governorship by his Lieutenant Governor, Enos T. Throop, a member of the regency.  In 1830, Throop ran for a full term.

Candidates
The Democratic Party nominated incumbent Governor Enos T. Throop. They nominated former state senator Edward Philip Livingston for Lieutenant Governor.

The National Republican Party nominated former state assemblyman and 1828 Lieutenant Gubernatorial candidate Francis Granger. They nominated Samuel Stevens for Lieutenant Governor.

The Working Men's Party nominated Ezekiel Williams.

Results
The Democratic ticket of Throop and Livingston was elected.

Sources
Result: The Tribune Almanac 1841

1830
New York
Gubernatorial election
November 1830 events